His Professional Record is 5-0 3ko's

Cyrus Ramone Pattinson (born 6 April 1994) is a British professional boxer and was an amateur boxer for Great Britain and Birtley ABC

Personal life
Born in Ashington, Pattinson was raised on various council estates in a Northumberland town, Alnwick. Educated at The Duchess's High School, he left to complete a Boxing Scholarship at Gateshead College, focusing solely on boxing.

Amateur highlights 
2012 Junior ABA Championships as a Welterweight 70 kg 
 Lost to Dan Woledge (St. Marys) 39-20 - Final 

2015 Elite ABA Championships as a Welterweight 69 kg 
 Defeated Stuart Buckley  3-0
 Defeated James Downs RSC2
 Defeated Garry Dodds 3-0
 Defeated Jack Raffety 3-0
 Defeated Scott Fitzgerald (boxer) 3-0
 Lost to Conor Loftus 3-0 - Final 

2015 Elite Tri Nation Championships as a Welterweight 69 kg 
 Defeated Kieran Gethin (Wales) 3-0
 Defeated Dennis Broadhurst (Scotland) 3-0 - Final 

2015 Elite GB Championships as a Welterweight 69 kg 
 Defeated Conor Loftus 3-0

2016 Bocskai Tournament as a Welterweight 69 kg 
 Defeated Viktor Agateljan (Czech) 3-0 - Quarter Final 
 Defeated Souleymane Cissokho (France) 3-0 - Semi Final
 Forced to Withdraw Arajik Marutjan (Germany) W.O - Final 

2016 European Olympic Qualifier as a Welterweight 69 kg 
 Defeated Muhammad Abdilrasoon (Finland) 3-0 
 Defeated Arajik Marutjan (Germany) 3-0 
 Lost to Vladimir Margaryan (Armenia) 3-0 

2016 Feliks Stamm Memorial Tournament as a Welterweight 69 kg 
 Defeated Damien Kiwio (Poland) 3-0
 Defeated Zdeněk Chládek (Czech) 2-1 

2018 Bocskai Tournament as a Welterweight 69 kg 
 Lost to Yaroslav Samofalov (Ukraine) 3-2

2017 Tammer Tournament as a Welterweight 69 kg 
 Defeated Saimonas Banys (Lithuania) 5-0 - Semi Final
 Defeated Kieran Molloy (Ireland) RSC1 - Final 

2018 Bocskai Tournament as a Welterweight 69 kg 
 Defeated Kálmán Hankó (Hungary) 4-1
 Defeated Kamil Holka (Poland) 5-0 - Quarter Final 
 Lost to András Vadász (Hungary) 3-2 - Semi Final 

2019 Livenstev Tournament as a Welterweight 69 kg 
 Lost to Gurgen Madoyan (Armenia) 5-0

2020 Bocskai Tournament as a Welterweight 69 kg 
 Defeated Mmusie Tswiige (Botswana) 4-1 - Preliminaries
 Defeated Don Emini (Norway) 5-0 - Pre Quarter Final
 Lost to Wahid Hambli (France) 3-2 - Quarter Final

References

1994 births
English male boxers
Living people
Sportspeople from Ashington
Welterweight boxers